Joshua J. Kassmier is an American politician and a Republican member of the Montana House of Representatives.

References

Living people
Republican Party members of the Montana House of Representatives
21st-century American politicians
1981 births
People from Fort Benton, Montana
Carroll College (Montana) alumni